Rodolfo "Rudy" Reyes (born December 3, 1970, in Richards-Gebaur Air Force Base, Kansas City, Missouri) is an American conservationist, martial arts instructor, actor, and former active duty United States Marine.  He is best known for portraying himself in the HBO TV miniseries Generation Kill.

Early years
Reyes was born in 1971 to a United States Marine father en route to Vietnam.  Reyes was raised by his grandparents until 1976 when both his grandmother and grandfather died in the same year.  He spent the next few years being shuffled between relatives and eventually the Omaha Home for Boys.  At 15 Reyes started studying kung fu.  At 17, Reyes emancipated himself and took custody of his two younger brothers, after which he moved to Kansas City, Missouri.  There, he continued to study and teach kung fu with his brothers.  Both Rudy and one of his younger brothers, Michael, worked at Lucille's Restaurant in Westport, Kansas City, Missouri, in the 1990s.

Military career
In 1998, Reyes joined the United States Marine Corps and was ultimately selected for (and passed) Marine Recon training. He served in Afghanistan and took part in the Iraq war.  Reyes served on the USS Dubuque and often led platoon PT sessions on ship. During the 2003 invasion of Iraq, Reyes was a team leader within the 1st Reconnaissance Battalion, which became the tip of the spear as the 1st Marine Division advanced on Baghdad; journalist Evan Wright embedded within Reyes' platoon and later wrote Generation Kill, a book depicting the events of the invasion from the perspective of the Recon Marines.

Trainer, actor, and writer
After leaving the military in 2005, Reyes became a fitness trainer at a gym in San Diego. His acting roles included playing himself in Generation Kill (2008) and the TV series Apocalypse Man, Ultimate Survival Alaska, and Spartan Race. He is also one of the interviewees of the 2020 documentary series Once Upon a Time in Iraq. He played "Solomon Goodblood" in a 2021 film The Secret of Sinchanee. In 2022, he became lead instructor on SAS: Who Dares Wins. He also portrays the playable character "Enzo Reyes" in the Call of Duty: Modern Warfare II multiplayer.

Reyes wrote the book, Hero Living: Seven Strides to Awaken Your Infinite Power (2009), with Angela Smith. He has also authored articles for OFFGRID magazine.

Conservationist
In 2016, Rudy Reyes founded the Force Blue Team, taking special operators- SEALS, Recon Marines, Pararescuemen, Special Forces and teamed them up with scientists to rebuild and restore coral reefs.

Sunga Life Model
In 2019, Rudy began modeling for Navy SEAL founded swimwear and athleisure brand Sunga Life, promoting which sells items such as sungas, silkies, and performance board shorts.

See also

List of U.S. Marines

References

External links

Rudy Reyes' Personal Website
Rudy Reyes on IMDb
Force Blue Team
Rudy Reyes Sunga Life Collection

1971 births
Living people
United States Marines
Male actors from Kansas City, Missouri
American male actors of Mexican descent
United States Marine Corps personnel of the War in Afghanistan (2001–2021)
United States Marine Corps personnel of the Iraq War